is a Japanese film director and screenwriter. He has produced three experimental shorts (Metal Days, Gerorisuto, and Caterpillar) and two full-length films (964 Pinocchio, and Rubber's Lover). These movies (excluding Metal Days) were widely available, having been issued on DVD by Unearthed Films. However, these releases have since gone out of print. He has released four more films since then (Onne, Den-Sen, The Hiding and 『S-94』). These are almost completely unknown outside Japan.

964 Pinocchio and Rubber's Lover are considered important, core films of the Japanese cyberpunk genre.

964 Pinocchio is often compared to Shinya Tsukamoto's cyberpunk classic Tetsuo: The Iron Man; Fukui worked on the crew for Tetsuo. Many fans and critics consider Fukui's aesthetic to be sufficiently divergent from Tsukamoto's for his films to stand on their own, even considering the extremely deep similarities.

Filmography
Metal Days (1986)
Gerorisuto (1986)
Caterpillar (1988)
964 Pinocchio (1991)
Rubber's Lover (1996)
Onne (2006)
Den-Sen (2006)
Derenai (2007) Director's Cut of Onne
The Hiding (2008)
S-94 (2009)

References

External links
 
 Shozin Fukui interview at wordriot.org
 Shozin Fukui's company

Japanese_film_directors
Japanese experimental filmmakers
Living people
1961 births